Manlio Moro (born 17 March 2002) is an Italian cyclist who currently rides for UCI Continental team .

Major results

Track
2021
 UEC European Under-23 Championships
3rd  Individual pursuit
3rd  Team pursuit
2022
 UEC European Under-23 Championships
1st  Team pursuit
3rd  Individual pursuit
 2nd  Team pursuit, UCI World Championships
 3rd  Individual pursuit, UEC European Championships
2023
 1st  Team pursuit, UEC European Championships

Road
2019
 1st Gran Premio Eccellenze Valli del Soligo (TTT)
2021
 1st Coppa Città di Bozzolo
2022
 1st Trofeo Menci Spa

References

External links
 

2002 births
Living people
Italian male cyclists
21st-century Italian people
Italian track cyclists